Dawn Lyn Nervik (born January 11, 1963) is an American former child actress who acted from age 4 to 15. She is best known for her role as Dodie Douglas during the last three seasons of the sitcom My Three Sons. Her brother, Leif Garrett, is a singer and actor.

Personal life
Dawn Lyn Nervik was born in Los Angeles, California, to Carolyn Stellar and Rik Nervik.

She and her older brother Leif Garrett began performing as child actors within a year or two of each other.

Career

Child actress
Dawn Lyn started her entertainment career at age five. She first appeared as an American Indian boy in the 1967 B-grade western Cry Blood, Apache at age 4. She stated that she'd only found out that she'd played a character of the opposite sex years later.

In 1969, Lyn played the character Prudence Everett in the pilot for the ABC series Nanny and the Professor but when the television pilot did not initially sell, she was released from her contract with ABC.

She was cast as Dodie Douglas on the long-running family comedy television series My Three Sons. ABC sued unsuccessfully to legally force Lyn to be Prudence Everett in Nanny and the Professor after she had already been cast for My Three Sons and started filming scenes as Dodie. After ABC's lawsuit against Lyn failed, Kim Richards was cast as Prudence Everett.

Lyn remained on My Three Sons until it ended three seasons later.

Later, Lyn worked steadily in her youth on many popular series like Adam-12; Emergency!; Marcus Welby, M.D.; Barnaby Jones; and Gunsmoke.

In 1971 Lyn had a major role in the western Shoot Out as Gregory Peck's character's daughter. She also appeared in movies such as the Walking Tall trilogy. (Her brother was also among the cast.) In 1973 Lyn auditioned for the role of Regan in The Exorcist, but was considered too young for the subject matter.

Dawn played the daughter of a slain man in a leading role in the 1973 Mannix episode, "Little Girl Lost".

She had a recurring role as Reagan in the 1974 NBC series Born Free. She also had a recurring role in the 1977 series The Red Hand Gang.

In 1974, Lyn appeared in the cult classic Devil Times Five, where Lyn's character Moe dumps a bucket of piranhas into a bathtub to creatively kill the character Lovely, played by Lyn's mother. (In Cry Blood Apache, the cowboy played by Lyn's father murdered the character played by her mother.)

Her last onscreen acting credit was in the 1978 Wonder Woman episode "My Teenage Idol is Missing" which starred her brother as a character similar to himself, a teen pop star, and in which Lyn played a devoted fan.

Later career
During a 1990 appearance in New York City for Nickelodeon, she was invited for an in-studio radio broadcast of The Howard Stern Show along with actress Erin Murphy (of Bewitched fame). Lyn and Murphy discussed international politics while egged on by Stern. It was Lyn's second appearance on Stern's program.

While living in Avalon on Catalina Island from 1997 to 2006, Lyn performed live voice acting with the Avalon Community Theater Radio Troupe. Actor Tony Dow (of Leave It To Beaver fame) participated in an in-studio show and later appeared with Lyn at an island charity fundraiser along with his TV brother Jerry Mathers and TV mother Barbara Billingsley. Actor Johnny Whitaker, a childhood friend of Lyn's when Family Affair was being shot on the same studio lot as My Three Sons, joined her in a live broadcast of the troupe's satire of the film Pearl Harbor (2001).

Notes

External links
 

American expatriates in Germany
American film actresses
American television actresses
Actresses from Los Angeles
American people of Norwegian descent
Living people
1963 births
American child actresses
People from Avalon, California
21st-century American women